Al-Nabi Shith Mosque was a historic Shi'ite Muslim mosque and shrine in Mosul, Iraq. The shrine is believed to contain the tomb of Seth, third son of Adam, known by Muslims as Sheth or simply Shith.

History 
The mosque dates back to the Ottoman period. It was built by Ahmad Basha ibn Suleyman Basha al-Jalili in 1815. The mosque was also at the centre of a cemetery, which had mausoleums present in the 20th century. At some point of time, the original Ottoman-period structure was destroyed and in the 1970s until 1980s a new mosque building and minaret were built over the destroyed site.

2014 demolition 
On 24 July 2014, the Islamic State of Iraq and the Levant detonated explosives inside the Al-Nabi Shith Mosque, destroying it completely.  The militants had also allegedly removed artifacts from the shrine and took them to an unknown location.

2022 reconstruction

References 

19th-century mosques
Mosques completed in the 1810s
Buildings and structures destroyed by ISIL
Destroyed mosques
Mosques in Mosul
Shia Islam in Iraq
Shia mosques in Iraq
Buildings and structures demolished in 2014
Attacks on Shiite mosques
Islamist attacks on mosques